Petit-Petit is the second full-length studio album by the Japanese idol group Idoling!!!. It reached number 17 on Oricon weekly chart.

Contents
Petit-Petit was released in three types:
 Premium edition (CD, DVD, and photobook)
 Standard edition (CD and DVD)
 Low Price edition (CD only)

Track listing

CD

DVD

Premium edition
 Third generation members audition video
 Maboroshi no HOT FANTAY ODAIBA 2008–2009 Live (2009.1.4) footage
 Dance video (Mujouken Koufuku A-type)
 Dance video (Kajuu 30% Orange Juice Tsubu Tsubu Iri)

Standard edition
 Third generation members audition video
 Maboroshi no HOT FANTAY ODAIBA 2008–2009 Live (2009.1.1) footage
 Dance video (Mujouken Koufuku B-type)

Notes
 Mujouken Koufuku was used as the ending song of Fuji TV's "Raion no Gokigenyō" from June 29 – September 25, 2009.
 Lemon Drop was used as the ending song of "Pyokotan Profile" movie.
 Forever Remember was performed by #3 Mai Endō, #6 Erica Tonooka, #9 Rurika Yokoyama, #11 Suzuka Morita, #15 Nao Asahi, #17 Hitomi Miyake, #20 Ai Ōkawa.
 Beta na Shitsuren ~Shibuya ni Furu Yuki~ was a sub-unit song performed by Kyun Kyun Idoling!!!.
 Royal Milk Girl was performed by #7 Erika Yazawa, #8 Fonchi, #12 Yui Kawamura, #13 Serina Nagano, #14 Hitomi Sakai, #16 Ami Kikuchi, #19 Yurika Tachibana, #21 Kaede Hashimoto, and Bakarhythm (Comedian and Idoling!!! TV show MC).
 NAGARA was a sub-unit song performed by Giza Giza Idoling!!!.
 Harukanaru Virgin Road was a sub-unit song performed by Ban Ban Idoling!!!.
 Kokuhaku was used as campaign song of Microsoft Windows Vista campaign "Vista Gakuen".
 Hannin wa Anata desu was a sub-unit song performed by Furi Furi Idoling!!!.
 baby blue was used as the ending song of Fuji TV's "Kiseki Taiken! Unbelievable" from April – July, 2009.
 Like a Shooting Star puru-lele ver. was performed by #3 Mai Endō.
 Tokimeki Dreaming!!! Dreaming!!!MIX was used as ROBO_JAPAN 2008 image song.

References

External links 
 Petit-Petit on iTunes Japan
  – Fuji TV
  – Pony Canyon
 Pony Canyon website

2009 albums
Pony Canyon albums
Idoling!!! albums